Viitna Pikkjärv (also known as Lake Viitna and Suurjärv) is a  lake in northern Estonia. It's located in Viitna village, Kadrina Parish, Lääne-Viru County.

Smaller lake Viitna Linajärv is located about 1.5 km northeast.

See also
Viitna Linajärv

References

Lakes of Estonia
Kadrina Parish
Landforms of Lääne-Viru County